Anja  (born 12 September 1989 in Kraljevo, Yugoslavia) is a Serbian beauty queen who represented her country in Miss International 2010 and was represented in the 2011 Miss Universe pageant.

Personal life
Šaranović studied Human resources at University of Belgrade's Faculty of Security Studies. She speaks English, Russian and Italian in addition to her native Serbian, and is actively engaged in athletics and swimming. For seven years she attended acting school in Belgrade and started her modeling career at seventeen, participating in Belgrade Fashion Week. On June, 2017, Šaranović married professional basketball player Dragan Zeković.
Anja was one of fourteen finalist of Competition in Oratory which was held on 27 January 2011 at the Belgrade Law School.

Miss Serbia 2010
As Miss Vrnjacka Banja Anja got a chance to participate in Miss Serbia 2010 pageant where she was chosen to represent Serbia at Miss Universe 2011.

Miss International 2010
Prior to her participation in Miss Universe 2011, Šaranović was the official representative of her country to the 2010 Miss International pageant held in Chengdu, where she placed as one of the Top 15 semifinalists of the competition, Šaranović took sixth place and was the highest ranked contestant from Europe. That was first placement for Serbia after separation from Montenegro and the second placement for Serbia since the Miss International competition started; the first was in 2005 when Sanja Miljanić representing Serbia and Montenegro finished in the top 12.

Miss Universe 2011

Šaranović, represented her country in the Miss Universe 2011, the 60th edition of the Miss Universe pageant, which was held at the Credicard Hall in São Paulo, Brazil on 12 September 2011 but didn't make in top 15.

References

External links 

 Anja Saranovic
 Interview with Anja in Spanish and English

1989 births
Living people
University of Belgrade Faculty of Law alumni
Miss International 2010 delegates
Miss Universe 2011 contestants
Serbian beauty pageant winners
Serbian female models
People from Kraljevo